History of Fear is a 2014 Argentine drama film directed by Benjamín Naishtat. The film had its premiere in the competition section of the 64th Berlin International Film Festival.

Cast
 Jonathan Da Rosa as Pola
 Tatiana Giménez as Tati
 Mirella Pascual as Teresa
 Claudia Cantero as Edith
 Francisco Lumerman as Camilo
 César Bordón as Carlos
 Valeria Lois as Beatriz
 Elsa Bois as Amalia
 Edgardo Castro as Marcelo

References

External links
 

2014 films
2014 drama films
Argentine drama films
2010s Spanish-language films
2010s Argentine films